Tommy Henderson (born 25 July 1943) is a Scottish former professional footballer, who played as a right winger for Leeds United, Bury, Swindon Town, Stockport County in the 1960s.

Playing career
Henderson joined Leeds United as a schoolboy in 1959 but returned to Scotland due to being homesick. Manager Don Revie brought him back to Leeds in November 1962 and he made 20 league appearances in the 1962–63 season. His place in the first team was taken by Johnny Giles in the following season and he made just four more appearances for Leeds before joining Bury in June 1965. He moved to Swindon Town during the 1965–66 season and then joined Stockport County for the 1966–67 season. In 1977, he played in Canada's National Soccer League with Ottawa Tigers. The following season he was named the head coach for Ottawa Tigers.

Playing statistics

References

Sources

Leeds United F.C. players
1943 births
Living people
Bury F.C. players
Swindon Town F.C. players
Stockport County F.C. players
Cork Hibernians F.C. players
Expatriate soccer players in South Africa
Scottish footballers
Scottish expatriate footballers
Scottish expatriate sportspeople in South Africa
English Football League players
Celtic F.C. players
Heart of Midlothian F.C. players
Hellenic F.C. players
St Mirren F.C. players
Altrincham F.C. players
Scottish Football League players
Jewish Guild players
Association football wingers
Canadian National Soccer League players
Canadian National Soccer League coaches